Ihamuotila is a Finnish surname. Notable people with this name include:

Jaakko Ihamuotila (born 1939), Finnish business executive
Johan (Janne) Ihamuotila (1868—1929), Finnish politician
Risto Ihamuotila (born 1938), Finnish academic
Veikko Ihamuotila (1911—1979), Finnish agricultural leader and government minister

Finnish-language surnames